Events in the year 1359 in Japan.

Incumbents
Monarch: Go-Kōgon

Births
January 11 - Emperor Go-En'yū (d. 1393)

References

 
 
Japan
Years of the 14th century in Japan